Kentucky Route 248 (KY 248) is a   state highway in the U.S. state of Kentucky.

Route description
The route originates at a junction with KY 44 near Litte Mount northeast of Taylorsville and travels eastward north of Taylorsville Lake. Roughly  from the western terminus, the route crosses into Anderson County and travels southward, crossing over Salt River and ending at its eastern terminus at US 62. The entire route is located in rural sections of Spencer and Anderson counties.

Major intersections

References

External links
 
 

0248
0248
0248